Chapel Hill-Carrboro City Schools (CHCCS) is a school district which educates over 12,000 students (pre-K through 12th grade) in the southeastern part of  Orange County, North Carolina. Being near three major universities as well as the Research Triangle Park, it serves one of the best educated populations in the United States. It is the school district for most of Chapel Hill (except the small portion of Chapel Hill that is in Durham County) and all of Carrboro, including schools from elementary through high school. It is financed through property taxes, including a city supplement, as well as state and federal funds. The administrative center is located at Lincoln Center at 750 South Merritt Mill Road. Lincoln Center is the site of the former all-black high school. Services are available for gifted, special needs, and limited English proficiency students.

Elementary schools

Carrboro Elementary - Cubs (serving downtown Carrboro and Chapel Hill; Colors: blue and white)
Ephesus Elementary - Roadrunners (serving Ephesus Road and east Chapel Hill; Colors: red, yellow and white)
Estes Hills Elementary - Eagles (serving central Chapel Hill around Estes Drive; Colors: green, gold and white)
Frank Porter Graham Bilingüe School - Winged Lions (serving all of the district; Colors: yellow, maroon and navy blue, 2018/19 was its 60th anniversary!)
Glenwood Elementary - Gators (serving east Chapel Hill; Color: green)
McDougle Elementary - Dolphins (serving central Carrboro; Colors: teal and yellow)
Morris Grove Elementary - Geckos (serving north Carrboro; Colors: blue and green)
Rashkis Elementary - Raptors (serving the neighborhood of Meadowmont Village; Colors: purple and yellow)
Mary Scroggs Elementary School - Frogs (serving the neighborhood of Southern Village; Colors: lime green and white)
Seawell Elementary - Seahawks (serving northwest and central Chapel Hill; Colors: blue and white)
 Northside Elementary - Navigators (serving Northside, Carrboro neighborhoods; Colors: blue and orange)

Middle schools

Grey Culbreth Middle School - Cougars (named after wounded warrior PV2 Grey Culbreth, serving 20 percent of southern Chapel Hill; Colors: blue and yellow/gold)
McDougle Middle School -  Mustangs (serving Carrboro; Colors: red and black)
Phillips Middle School -  Falcons (serving central Chapel Hill; Colors: green and white)
Smith Middle School - Cyclones (serving northern Chapel Hill; Colors: turquoise, white, black and silver)

High schools
The traditional high schools located in the District are:

Carrboro High School
Chapel Hill High School
East Chapel Hill High School

Phoenix Academy High School is an alternative high school for students needing a different environment.

Academics
The Chapel Hill-Carrboro City School District has been called one of the top 37 school districts in the United States and the top performing school district in the Southeast United States. This is according to the criteria of student scores on the SAT, student participation in Advanced Placement courses, and the number of National Merit Scholars.

The district is known for its high quality student scores, especially at the high school level. Two of the currently open high schools, Chapel Hill High and East Chapel Hill High, have been featured as some of the nation's best by the Newsweek Top 100 High Schools, as well as The Wall Street Journal (October 15, 1999).  Carrboro High School opened in 2007.

Approximately one-third of the K-12 student population is identified as eligible to receive gifted services.

References

External links
 Chapel Hill-Carrboro City Schools Home

 
School districts in North Carolina
School districts established in 1909